Sonogram may refer to:

 S.O.N.O.G.R.A.M., a 2005 album by One Be Lo
 Sonograph, a term used for an audio-frequency spectrogram, a visual representation of the spectrum of frequencies in a sound
 Ultrasonogram, a diagnostic imaging technique based on the application of ultrasound

See also 

 Sinogram (disambiguation)